Cerodirphia avenata is a moth of the  family Saturniidae. It is found in Costa Rica, Venezuela, and Panama.

Subspecies
Cerodirphia avenata avenata
Cerodirphia avenata araguensis Lemaire, 1971 (Venezuela)

References

Moths described in 1930
Saturniidae
Moths of South America
Moths of Central America